Killer Flick is a 1998 American independent black comedy road film written and directed by Mark Weidman that follows a group of people as they go on a crime spree and film their own activities.

Production
Writer/director Mark Weidman quit his day job as a teacher and, along with his brother-in-law Chip Smith, formed Smile House Production in order to make the film. Together, Weidman and Smith "cobbled together $250,000 for a 13-day guerrilla shoot".  For use in the film, Smith arranged construction of a gas station set on a property near Barstow to be blown up as an effect for the film.

Plot summary
The film centers on four aspiring filmmakers, Rome, Buzz, Max, and One-Eye (Tod Thawley, Creighton Howard, Emmett Grennan, and Christian Leffler), who go on a surreal rampage and make their exploits into a movie. While evading law enforcement, the filmmakers discuss their plans on how to make their movie as violent and sexy as possible so that they can sell it for a lot of money.

After the group blows up a gas station, Rome flirts with Tess (Kathleen Macdonald), an attractive woman he meets on the street, and tries to cast her. He gives her a copy of the script to audition, but after reading it, she disgustedly argues with the group about the shallow, adolescent nature of their movie. The argument is part of the script, however, and Tess passes the audition. The group orchestrates a few more scenes of violence for the movie, at times by recruiting bystanders at gunpoint to play roles, while other times creating situations simply by writing them into the script.

Needing a villain for the movie, the group decides to kidnap their favorite B-movie star, Virgil Morgan (Fred Dennis), and force him to participate. They arrive at Virgil's Hollywood home and abduct him. After a few unsuccessful attempts to film a scene, Virgil tutors the group on basic filmmaking skills. Most of the actors that appear in the film, including those whose characters have already been killed, gather in Virgil's living room and perform a read-through of the script.

The group orchestrates a climactic car chase and gun battle. During the chase, the group decides to name their movie "Killer Flick", with the tagline "Because we'd kill to make a movie". At the end of the chase, Tess is shot and killed. The group tearfully cremates her, consoled in the knowledge that her death was required by the traditional structures of screenwriting.

Cast
The film's onscreen credits offer a film-within-a-film credits list for the characters: "Rome" as Director,  "One Eye" as Photographer, "Max" as Script, "Buzz" as Music, and "Tess" as Love Interest, followed by onscreen credits for the actors:
  Tod Thawley as Rome (as Zen Todd)
 Christian Leffler as One Eye
 Emmett Grennan as Max
 Creighton Howard as Buzz
 Kathleen Macdonald as Tess (as Kathleen Walsh)
 Fred Dennis as Virgil Morgan
 Virgil Frye as Sheriff
 Kareem Oliver as Rodney
 Kyle Van Horne as Lyle
 Karen Christensen as Red Hill Waitress
 Sheri Hellard as Waitress at Fuzzy's
 Casey Slade as Pastry Face Cop
 Jon Kinney as Grip
 Richard T. Smith as Sheriff'S Deputy
 Judi O'Neal as Sadie

Reception
Critical reception has been mixed.  DVD Talk gave a mostly negative review that opined that the commentary track might be useful for prospective indie low-budget filmmakers, but that the movie itself was "weak" and "tough to sit through".  Kevin Thomas of the Los Angeles Times gave a brief but enthusiastic review that called Killer Flick "an outrageous, inspired satire".  In his book "The Reality Effect: Film Culture and the Graphic Imperative", author and scholar Joel Black referred to the film as "an over the top black comedy".  LA Weekly reviewer Chuck Wilson remarks upon the film's scene where the group's leader and film-within-a-film-director, Rome (played by Tod Thawley), shows attraction for the lead actress "in order to give the movie a 'love interest'" and then apologizes to the rest of his group for his "lousy dialogue". The reviewer felt that director Weidman cut to rehearsals where the actors to be killed off try out various bits of dialog, and in noting the cast agreeing that the film is becoming too "self-referential" s and says so out loud, was astute in "beating the audience to the punch."  It was concluded that "Miramax would love these guys."  San Francisco Weekly noted "Mark Weidman shows how to graft a grade-Z road movie  onto a Brechtian scenario of self-reflexivity and narrative breakdown," and concluded he was able to "make a breathless, funny, inventive film."

Releases
The film had festival screenings in 1998 and 1999, and was released on DVD by Vanguard Cinema in 2003.  The film had theatrical release when the Laemmle Theatres in West Los Angeles showed the film as a midnight feature on Friday and Saturday nights. Crowds were large enough that they extended the run.

References

External links
 
  Killer FLick at Turner Classic Movies
 
 Killer FLick review at BloodyTypeOnline

1998 films
American independent films
American satirical films
American black comedy films
1990s exploitation films
American road movies
1990s road movies
1990s satirical films
1990s black comedy films
1998 directorial debut films
1998 comedy films
1990s English-language films
1990s American films